Hailes may refer to:

Places 
 Hailes, Gloucestershire, England, the location of Hailes Abbey 
 Hailes Castle, the castle in East Lothian, Scotland
 Hailles, a commune in the Picardy region of France
 Wester Hailes, Edinburgh, Scotland

People 
 Nathaniel Hailes (1802–1879), early settler in South Australia
 Patrick Hepburn, 1st Lord Hailes
 Patrick Hepburn, 1st Earl of Bothwell, 2nd Lord Hailes
 Patrick Buchan-Hepburn, 1st Baron Hailes
 Sir David Dalrymple, 1st Baronet of Hailes
 Sir James Dalrymple, 2nd Baronet of Hailes
 Sir David Dalrymple, 3rd Baronet, Lord Hailes
 Adam Hepburn, Master of Hailes
 Lady Hailes

Other 
 Hailes (ball game) is a Scottish ball game
 Hailes Halt railway station, a former station near Edinburgh
 Lordship and Barony of Hailes, a Scottish feudal lordship